Jean-Baptiste Mendy (16 March 1963 – 31 August 2020) was a Senegal-born French professional boxer who competed from 1983 to 2000. He was a two-time lightweight world champion, having held the WBC title from 1996 to 1997 and the WBA title from 1998 to 1999. At regional level he held the European lightweight title twice between 1992 and 1995.

Professional career 
Mendy turned pro in 1983 and captured the vacant WBC lightweight title with a win over Lamar Murphy in 1996.  He lost the title in his first defense to Stevie Johnston the following year.  In 1998, he captured the WBA lightweight title with a decision win over Orzubek Nazarov.  He defended the belt once before losing it to Julien Lorcy in 1999.  He retired the following year.

Personal life
He died at the age of 57 from cancer on 31 August 2020 in Paris, France

See also 
 List of lightweight boxing champions
 List of WBC world champions
 List of WBA world champions

References

External links 
 

1963 births
2020 deaths
Senegalese emigrants to France
Sportspeople from Dakar
Lightweight boxers
Southpaw boxers
World Boxing Association champions
World Boxing Council champions
World lightweight boxing champions
World boxing champions
French male boxers